The Fiji College of Theology and Evangelism (informally Fiji College, FCTE or simply Fiji Bible College) is the oldest accredited theological college in Fiji. It was established in Fiji in 1974. The college decided to offer courses externally, making it the second largest (behind PTC) in Fiji.

The college has a number of small special-purpose satellite campuses around the Lautoka and Suva regions, however the main campus is centred on the larger BuaBua grounds located in Lautoka which spreads across the western outskirts of Lautoka.
The College is a member many academic associations and recently gained accreditation from the Fiji Government and Fiji Education Board. There are now over 700-800 students enrolled for courses with the college.

External links 
 Main Site
 Library

Education in Fiji
Evangelical seminaries and theological colleges
Educational institutions established in 1974
1974 establishments in Fiji